2014 in women's road cycling is about the 2014 women's bicycle races ruled by the UCI and the 2014 UCI Women's Teams.

UCI Road World Rankings

Final ranking 2014

World Championships

The World Road Championships is set to be held in Ponferrada, Spain.

UCI World Cup

Source

Single day races (1.1 and 1.2)

Source

† The clock symbol denotes a race which takes the form of a one-day time trial.

Stage races (2.1 and 2.2)

Source

Cancelled events

Championships

International Games

Continental Championships

Source

National Championships

UCI teams

References

See also

 2014 in men's road cycling

 

Women's road cycling by year